David James "D.J." Moore (born March 22, 1987) is a former American football cornerback. He was drafted 119th overall in the fourth round of the 2009 NFL Draft by the Chicago Bears. He played college football at Vanderbilt.

High school career
In high school, he was a four-year football varsity player at Broome High School in Spartanburg, South Carolina. He was a player that played both offense and defense, starting at Wide Receiver and Defensive Back. As a senior, had 48 receptions for 896 yards and 14 touchdowns; one rush for an 84-yard touchdown; three punt return touchdowns; 39 tackles and 6 interceptions on defense. He also played basketball in high school, helping squad to state title as a junior. As a senior in basketball, he averaged 15 points, 10 rebounds, and five assists.

Accomplishments
 AA Special Teams Player of the Year
 Region 2-2A Player of the Year
 Two-time All-State Wide Receiver
 2004 State Title for Football
 2004 State Championship Football MVP
 Three-time All-State in Basketball
 Track and Field State Champion as High jumper

College career
Moore played college football at Vanderbilt for three seasons, playing in 37 games, while starting 34 of them as defensive back. Moore recorded 13 interceptions in his career, which is tied for third in school history.

While playing at Vanderbilt, he garnered First-team All-SEC honors from the Associated Press in his sophomore and junior years. He was also named an All-American in his junior year, as he helped lead Vanderbilt to victory in the 2008 Music City Bowl, exactly 53 years since the team's last victory at a bowl.  In an interview following the game, Moore announced that he would forgo his senior season to enter the NFL draft.

Professional career

Chicago Bears
Moore was selected by the Chicago Bears in the fourth round of the 2009 NFL Draft. On May 29, 2009, he signed a 4-year deal with Chicago, signing him through 2012. Moore appeared in three games in his rookie season, serving as a backup cornerback behind Charles Tillman and Corey Graham at the left cornerback position. During the 2010 season, Moore saw considerable playing time contributing as the nickelback when the team left its base 4–3 coverage. He intercepted two passes from Tony Romo during a game against the Dallas Cowboys. On October 24, 2010, he intercepted a pass from Donovan McNabb of the Washington Redskins and ran it back 54 yards for a touchdown. Moore also returned another McNabb interception for a touchdown, but it was nullified due to a holding penalty. In the 2011 season against the Detroit Lions, Moore was ejected from the game for starting a brawl after Lions quarterback Matthew Stafford pulled him down by the helmet.

After the 2012 season the Bears decided not to re-sign Moore.

Carolina Panthers
On March 19, 2013, Moore signed a one-year contract with the Carolina Panthers. He was released on October 21, 2013.

Tampa Bay Buccaneers
On February 14, 2014, the Tampa Bay Buccaneers signed Moore, reuniting him with his former coach in Chicago, Lovie Smith.

References

External links
Chicago Bears bio
Vanderbilt Commodores bio
NFL Events: Combine Player Profiles - D.J. Moore
Chicago Bears Player Bio - D.J. Moore

1987 births
Living people
Sportspeople from Spartanburg, South Carolina
Players of American football from South Carolina
American football cornerbacks
Vanderbilt Commodores football players
Chicago Bears players
Carolina Panthers players
Tampa Bay Buccaneers players